Feza Gürsey (April 7, 1921 – April 13, 1992) was a Turkish mathematician and physicist. Among his most prominent contributions to theoretical physics,  his works on the Chiral model  and on SU(6)  are most popular.

Early life 
Feza Gürsey was born on April 7, 1921, in Istanbul, to Reşit Süreyya Gürsey, a military physician, and Remziye Hisar, a chemist and a pioneering female Turkish scientist. He graduated from Galatasaray High School in 1940, and received his degree in Mathematics – Physics from Istanbul University in 1944.

Career 
Through a scholarship from the Turkish Ministry of Education he received while he was an assistant in Istanbul University, he pursued a doctorate degree at the Imperial College London in the United Kingdom. He completed his work on the application of quaternions to quantum field theory in 1950. After spending the period from 1950 to 1951 in postdoctoral research at Cambridge University, he worked as an assistant at Istanbul University, where he married Suha Pamir, also a physics assistant, in 1952, and in 1953 he acquired the title of associate professor.

During 1957–1961 he worked at Brookhaven National Laboratory, Institute for Advanced Study in Princeton, New Jersey, and Columbia University. In 1960s, he worked on the nonlinear chiral Lagrangian, and produced results of relevance to quantum chromodynamics.

Returning to Turkey in 1961, he accepted the title of professor from Middle East Technical University (METU) and took part in the establishment of METU Department of Theoretical Physics. Continuing his work as a lecturer at METU until 1974, he  formed a  research group.

Being offered a position at Yale University in 1965, he started to work in both Yale University and METU, until 1974, when he decided to give up his position in METU and settle in the United States to continue with Yale. During these years, he took part in the formulation of E(6) grand unified theories.

Death and legacy 
Gürsey died in 1992, in New Haven, Connecticut. He is survived by his son, Yusuf Gürsey. The Feza Gürsey Institute, founded by the joint effort of Boğaziçi University and TÜBİTAK in Turkey, is named in his honor.

Edward Witten notes:

Publications 

 (With Chia-Hsiung Tze) On the Role of Division, Jordan, and Related Algebras in Particle Physics (1996),

Awards and honors 

1969 Scientific and Technological Research Council of Turkey (TÜBİTAK) Science Award
1977 J. Robert Oppenheimer Memorial Prize together with Sheldon Glashow
1977 A. Cressey Morrison Prize together with R. Griffiths in Natural Sciences
1981 Collège de France Award
1983 Honorary title of "Commendatore" by Italy
1986 Wigner medal administered by the Group Theory and Fundamental Physics Foundation
1989 Award of Association of Turkish - American Scientists and Engineers
1990 Galatasaray Foundation Award

The Feza Gürsey Institute in Istanbul and Feza Gürsey Science Center in Ankara are named in his honor. Boğaziçi University maintains a Feyza Gürsey Archive. His bronze likeness can be encountered at a number of places in Turkey, for example a sculpture by Charlotte Langlands is present at the Nesin Mathematics Village.

References

External links
 Feza Gürsey Institute (official web site)
 Feza Gürsey 

20th-century Turkish mathematicians
Turkish emigrants to the United States
1921 births
Scientists from Istanbul
1992 deaths
Galatasaray High School alumni
Alumni of Imperial College London
Istanbul University alumni
Academic staff of Middle East Technical University
Yale University faculty
Theoretical physicists
Turkish nuclear physicists
Recipients of TÜBİTAK Science Award
Members of the Turkish Academy of Sciences
Columbia University faculty
Alumni of the University of Cambridge
METU Mustafa Parlar Foundation Science Award winners
Mathematical physicists
American academics of Turkish descent
Fellows of the American Physical Society
Turkish expatriates in the United Kingdom